Shlomo Kalish is an Israeli businessman. He is the Founder and Managing Partner at Jerusalem Global Ventures  and also a Managing Partner of Corundum Open Innovation Ltd.

Biography
Shlomo Kalish was born in 1952 in Haifa, Israel to Issacher Dov and Haya Kalish- both Holocaust survivors. Kalish served as a fighter pilot from 1971–1975, which included the Yom Kippur War.

In 1977, Kalish received a B.Sc. in Mathematics from Tel Aviv University.  He completed an M.Sc. and a PhD at MIT's Sloan School   In 1981 he began teaching at the University of Rochester. In 1985 he joined the Management Faculty of Tel Aviv University, and established a hi-tech consulting business.

Business career
In 1999 Kalish founded Jerusalem Global Ventures, a Jerusalem-based VC. Kalish also served as General Partner of Concord Ventures I, LP from 1997-1999. Kalish led investments in Saifun Semiconductors, Oridion Medical, Oren Semiconductors, Creo, QXL, Mellanox Technologies, Picturevision and Galileo. In 1999, Kalish also founded Yazam.com, one of the accelerators aimed at internet projects in Israel.

Community activism
Shlomo Kalish is a board member at the charity Shalom Beineinu, which he founded.

References 

Israeli businesspeople
1952 births
Living people
Ayn Rand Institute